Haba Station (羽場駅) is the name of two train stations in Japan:

 Haba Station (Gifu)
 Haba Station (Nagano)